Ganesh ... just Ganesh is a 2009 Indian Telugu-language romantic drama film written and directed by debutant M. Saravanan and produced by Sri Sravanthi Movies. It stars Ram as the title character alongside Kajal Aggarwal and Poonam Kaur. This films also features 26 kids and comedian Brahmanandam.

Ganesh began its production in December 2008 and ended in August 2009. The film features music by Mickey J. Meyer while cinematography and editing are performed by Hari Anumolu and A. Sreekar Prasad respectively. The film was theatrically released on 24 September 2009.

Plot

Ganesh is an orphan who always pitches in to help needy people. In one such strange situation, he is forced to pretend to Divya that he loves her. Later on, she discovers that he loves her to fulfill another ambition and that his love is false. By then, Ganesh genuinely falls in love with her. He then convinces her of his love's authenticity.

Cast

 Ram as Ganesh
 Kajal Aggarwal as Divya
 Poonam Kaur as Deepa
 Ashish Vidyarthi as Mahadev
 Brahmanandam as Yadagiri
 Rashmi Gautam as Archana
 Sudha as Divya's mother
 Rohini Hattangadi as Divya's aunt
 Y. Kasi Viswanath as Divya's uncle
 Sameer as Divya's brother
 Surekha Vani as Divya's sister-in-law
 Fish Venkat as Mahadev's henchman
 Saptagiri as Apparao
 Ravi Prakash as Prakash 
 Rajitha

Production and release 
The film began its production in December 2008, and ended in August 2009. Ganesh released theatrically on 24 September 2009.

The film was later dubbed into Hindi as Kshatriya: Ek Yoddha in 2011.

Soundtrack

The soundtrack of the film was released on 10 September 2009. It had music scored by composer, Mickey J Meyer. Lyrics have been written by Ramajogaiah Sastri. The music was launched at Rama Naidu studios by Jr. NTR.

Reviews
Radhika Rajamani of Rediff.com called it a "fun" film, and wrote: "This movie harks back to the days of good ol' movies like The Sound of Music." On performances, 123telugu.com stated: "Ram is the main attraction of the movie and he delivers a sincere performance as Ganesh.”

References

External links
 

2009 films
2000s Telugu-language films
Films scored by Mickey J Meyer
Indian romantic comedy films
2009 romantic comedy films